Below is the list of plants, listed under the section "Catalogue of the Herbs and Plants, in this Treatise, appropriated to their several PLANETS" in the 1652 medical text The English Physitian: or an Astrologo-physical Discourse of the Vulgar Herbs of This Nation by Nicholas Culpeper.

Under Saturn                 (53)

Under Jupiter          (34)

Under Mars         (40)

Under the Sun            (25)

Under Venus         (73)

Under Mercury          (35)

Under the Moon       (26)

Lists of plants
History-related lists